Francovich may refer to:

People
Albert A. Francovich (1920-1942), a United States Navy sailor and Navy Cross recipient
Allan Francovich (1941-1997), an American film producer and director
Riccardo Francovich (1946-2007), an Italian archaeologist

Law
The Francovich principle, a principle of European Union law

Ships
USS Francovich, the name of more than one United States Navy ship

See also
Francovichia